The list of current and past Rajya Sabha members from the Chhattisgarh State. State elect 5 member for the term of 6 years and indirectly elected by the state legislators, since year 2000.

Current Members (2022)

Keys:

Chronological list of all Rajya Sabha members from Chhattisgarh state 
Chronological list by last date of appointment
 Star (*) represents current Rajya Sabha members from CG State.

References

External links
Rajya Sabha homepage hosted by the Indian government
List of Sitting Members of Rajya Sabha (Term Wise) 
MEMBERS OF RAJYA SABHA (STATE WISE RETIREMENT LIST) 

Chhattisgarh
 
Rajya Sabha